75 Cancri (abbreviated to 75 Cnc) is a binary star in the constellation of Cancer. The system is located about 102 light-years (31 parsecs) away, based on its stellar properties.

75 Cancri is a spectroscopic binary, which means the two stellar components are too close to be resolved, but periodic Doppler shifts in their spectra indicate orbital motion. In this case, light from both stars can be detected, and it is a double-lined spectroscopic binary. The orbital period of the system is 19.41 days, and the eccentricity of the system is 0.19494, implying a slightly elliptical orbit.

References

Cancer (constellation)
Cancri, 75
G-type main-sequence stars
Spectroscopic binaries
Durchmusterung objects
9286
078418
044892
3626